The 2022 Croatian Cup Final between the Adriatic rivals Rijeka and Hajduk Split was played on 26 May 2022 in Split, Croatia.

Road to the final

Match details

References

External links
Official website 

2022 Final
HNK Rijeka matches
HNK Hajduk Split matches
Cup Final
Croatian Football Cup Final